John McEnroe was the defending champion, but did not participate this year.

Stefan Edberg won the title, defeating Mats Wilander 6–2, 6–1, 6–1 in the final.

Seeds

Draw

Finals

Top half

Section 1

Section 2

Bottom half

Section 3

Section 4

External links
 ATP main draw

Stockholm Open
1986 Grand Prix (tennis)